Olha Moroz (born 16 August 1970) is a Ukrainian sprinter. She competed in the women's 4 × 400 metres relay at the 1996 Summer Olympics.

References

1970 births
Living people
Athletes (track and field) at the 1996 Summer Olympics
Ukrainian female sprinters
Olympic athletes of Ukraine
Place of birth missing (living people)
Olympic female sprinters